David A. Galloway (born 5 March 1943), a Canadian, was the CEO of Torstar and was chairman of the board of Bank of Montreal from 2004 to 2012, which is also known as BMO Financial Group.

As well, Galloway served on the audit, human resources, governance and risk review committees of the Board of Directors of the Bank of Montreal.

He has also served on the Board of a number of public companies, including Abitibi, Cognos, Shell Canada, Hudson's Bay Company, Westbourne Inc. and Clearnet Communications.

Born in Toronto, Ontario, he attended the University of Toronto Schools before receiving a Bachelor of Arts in 1966 from the University of Toronto. He received an M.B.A. from Harvard University in 1968.

From 1983 to 1988, he was the president and C.E.O. of Harlequin Enterprises Ltd. He was president and chief executive officer of Torstar Corporation from 1988 to 2002. He was succeeded by John Honderich as publisher of Torstar.

Prior to joining the Harlequin/Torstar group of companies, for ten years, he was a founding partner of the Canada Consulting Group – a leading strategic management consulting firm, which was acquired by the Boston Consulting Group in 1992.

He is on the board of directors of Scripps Networks Interactive.

References
 Bank of Montreal Board of Directors: David A. Galloway consulted May 20, 2006.
 BMO Annual Report. 2005 consulted May 20, 2006.
 Canadian Who's Who 1997 entry consulted May 28, 2006.

1943 births
Living people
Businesspeople from Toronto
Directors of Bank of Montreal
Canadian newspaper executives
Harvard Business School alumni
University of Toronto alumni
Canadian chairpersons of corporations
Canadian chief executives
Canadian corporate directors
Torstar people